Wilder Pedro de Morais (born June 29, 1968) is a Brazilian politician. He has represented Goiás in the Federal Senate since 2012.  He is a member of the Progressive Party.

References

Living people
1968 births
Members of the Federal Senate (Brazil)
Progressistas politicians